The Bulgaria 2030 FIFA World Cup bid was a joint bid to host the 2030 FIFA World Cup by Bulgaria, Greece, Romania and Serbia. The bid was led by the Craiova Group.

On 25 February 2019, at the meeting in Sofia, Bulgaria of the Ministers of Youth and Sports of Romania, Constantin Bogdan Matei; Bulgaria, Krasen Kralev; Serbia, Vanja Udovičić and Deputy Minister of Culture and Sports of Greece, Giorgos Vasileiadis, it was officially confirmed that these four countries would submit joint candidacy for the organization of the UEFA Euro 2028 and the 2030 FIFA World Cup. Following the second meeting, the ministers signed a memorandum of understanding on 10 April 2019 in Thessaloniki, Greece. However, the project has been quietly abandoned, mainly due to Greece bidding with Egypt and Saudi Arabia.

Possible venues
For the 2026 FIFA World Cup, it has been confirmed that stadiums must have a capacity of at least 40,000 for group round matches and second round matches, 50,000 for quarter final and 60,000 for the semi-finals and at least 80,000 for the Opening Match and Final; none of the countries concerned have stadiums with such a capacity for the opening and final matches as of yet and the rules for 2030 have not been announced. Olympic Stadium was the stadium mentioned to host the Opening Match, while the Bucharest Arena was set for the Final match.

Bulgaria

Greece

Romania

Serbia

Key people
Borislav Mihaylov – president of the Bulgarian Football Union
Evangelos Grammenos – president of the Hellenic Football Federation
Răzvan Burleanu – president of the Romanian Football Federation
Slaviša Kokeza – president of the Football Association of Serbia

See also
Uruguay–Argentina–Chile–Paraguay 2030 FIFA World Cup bid
Spain–Portugal–Morocco 2030 FIFA World Cup bid

References

Bulgaria at the FIFA World Cup
Greece at the FIFA World Cup
Romania at the FIFA World Cup
Serbia at the FIFA World Cup
Bulgaria-Greece-Romania-Serbia 2030 FIFA World Cup bid